Events in the year 1894 in Japan.

Incumbents
Emperor: Emperor Meiji
Prime Minister: Itō Hirobumi

Governors
Aichi Prefecture: Tokito Konkyo
Akita Prefecture: Yasuhiko Hirayama
Aomori Prefecture: Masa Sawa
Ehime Prefecture: Katsumata Minoru then Chang Masaya Komaki
Fukui Prefecture: Kunizo Arakawa
Fukuoka Prefecture: Kojiro Iwasaki
Fukushima Prefecture: Yoshio Kusaka
Gifu Prefecture: Michio Sokabe
Gunma Prefecture: Motootoko Nakamura
Hiroshima Prefecture: Baron Nabeshima Miki
Ibaraki Prefecture: Takasaki
Iwate Prefecture: Ichizo Hattori
Kagawa Prefecture: Baron Umashi Obata
Kochi Prefecture: Ishida Eikichi
Kumamoto Prefecture: Matsudaira Masanao
Kyoto Prefecture: Hiroshi Nakai then Chiaki Watanabe
Mie Prefecture: Shangyi Narukawa
Miyagi Prefecture: Minoru Katsumata
Nagano Prefecture: Asada Tokunor
Niigata Prefecture: Baron Seung Zhi Kuwata
Oita Prefecture: Tameharu Yamada
Okinawa Prefecture: Shigeru Narahara
Osaka Prefecture: Nobumichi Yamada
Saga Prefecture: Takaya Nagamine then Teru Tanabe
Saitama Prefecture: Tomi Senketaka
Shimane Prefecture: Mamoru Funakoshi then Oura Kanetake
Tochigi Prefecture: Orita Hirauchi then Sato Nobu
Tokyo: Miura Yasushi
Toyama Prefecture: Tokuhisa Tsunenori
Yamagata Prefecture: Hasebe Ren then Shuichi Kinoshita

Events
July 25 – Battle of Pungdo
July 28–29 – Battle of Seonghwan
September 15 – Battle of Pyongyang
September 17 – Battle of the Yalu River (1894)
October 24 – Battle of Jiuliancheng
November 21 – Battle of Lushunkou; Japanese forces storm all China's landward defences by noon the following day.<ref>{{Cite book | last = Paine | first = S.C.M. | title = ArizoThe Sino-Japanese War of 1894-1895: Perception, Power, and Primacy | publisher= Cambridge University Press | year =  2003 | isbn= 0-521-61745-6|pages=197–213 }}</ref>

Births
January 1 – Shitsu Nakano, super-centenarian (d. 2007)
April 15 – Kiichi Hasegawa, naval commander (d. 1944)
April 18 – Kitsuju Ayabe, military commander (d. 1980)
April 25 – Takeshi Mori, military commander (d. 1945)
October 21 – Edogawa Ranpo, author and critic (d. 1965)
November 27 – Konosuke Matsushita, founder of Matsushita Electric (d. 1989)date unknown'' – Masataka Taketsuru, founder of Japan's whisky industry (d. 1979)

Deaths
May 16 – Kitamura Tokoku,  poet, essayist and writer (b. 1868)
July 6 – Takahashi Yuichi, yōga painter (b. 1828)

References

 
1890s in Japan
Years of the 19th century in Japan